Gerdán Fonseca is a Paralympian athlete from Cuba competing mainly in category F44 shot put events.

Gerdán won the bronze medal in the F44/46 shot put event in the 2004 Summer Paralympics in Athens, Greece.  Four years later, in the F44 class, he repeated this feet in Beijing in the 2008 Summer Paralympics where he also competed in the F44 discus.

References

External links
 

Paralympic athletes of Cuba
Athletes (track and field) at the 2004 Summer Paralympics
Athletes (track and field) at the 2008 Summer Paralympics
Athletes (track and field) at the 2016 Summer Paralympics
Paralympic bronze medalists for Cuba
Living people
Medalists at the 2004 Summer Paralympics
Medalists at the 2008 Summer Paralympics
Cuban male shot putters
Cuban male javelin throwers
Year of birth missing (living people)
Paralympic medalists in athletics (track and field)
Medalists at the 2011 Parapan American Games
Medalists at the 2015 Parapan American Games
21st-century Cuban people